Hon. Thomas William Coventry (24 December 1778 – April 1816) was an English amateur cricketer.

He was the youngest son of George Coventry, 6th Earl of Coventry and his second wife Barbara St John.

In 1797 he inherited the estate, including North Cray Place in Kent, of his godfather, Thomas Coventry. He sold the contents of the house in 1804.

He made two known appearances in first-class cricket matches from 1800 to 1801 and was a member of Marylebone Cricket Club (MCC).

He married Catherine Clarke and had a son and 2 daughters. On his death in 1816 he left the North Cray estate to his son, Thomas William Coventry, who was only 16 years old.

References

External sources
 CricketArchive record

1778 births
1816 deaths
English cricketers
English cricketers of 1787 to 1825
Non-international England cricketers
Cricketers from Coventry
Marylebone Cricket Club cricketers
Younger sons of earls